The men's 1500 metre freestyle competition at the 2018 Mediterranean Games was held on 24 June 2018 at the Campclar Aquatic Center.

Records 
Prior to this competition, the existing world and Mediterranean Games records were as follows:

Results 
The heats were held at 10:28 and 18:38.

References 

Men's 1500 metre freestyle